The Cannon Farm is a historic farmstead at 5470 NW 37th Court in Bell, Florida.  The main house is a vernacular wood-frame structure that was originally built in 1898 as a schoolhouse when the area was part of Alachua County.  The  parcel includes, in addition to the main house, a sugar cane grinder dating to the turn of the 20th century, and a corn crib and sugar kettle shed dating to the early years of the farm, c. 1932.  The complex is a well-preserved small rural farmstead.

The farmstead was listed on the National Register of Historic Places in 2013.

References

Houses on the National Register of Historic Places in Florida
Houses in Gilchrist County, Florida
School buildings completed in 1898
Farms on the National Register of Historic Places in Florida
National Register of Historic Places in Gilchrist County, Florida